Artemis Joukowsky III is an American director, author, producer and disabilities activist. He is best known for his work on the documentary films Defying the Nazis: The Sharps' War, Carbon Nation and more.

Life and career
Artemis Joukowsky III was born to Artemis A.W. Joukowsky and Martha Sharp Joukowsky. His father was chancellor of Brown University, and mother a Near Eastern archaeologist; together they established the Joukowsky Institute for Archaeology and the Ancient World. He is the grandson of Waitstill Sharp and Martha Sharp, who helped save hundreds of endangered Jews and refugees escape from Nazi camps. To honour his grandparents he co-directed a documentary film Defying the Nazis: The Sharps' War in 2016 along with director Ken Burns. He was a vice-chairman of Econergy International, and co-founded the Highland Energy Group.

Joukowsky was diagnosed with Spinal Muscular Atrophy type III at the age of 14 years. He is the co-founder with Larry Rothstein of No Limits Media (NLM). He holds a BA in Social Ecology from Hampshire College and an MA in Psychology from Goddard College. He was a member of the United States Paralympics team and his other works were “Raising the Bar:  New Horizons in Disability Sports” a book which he co-wrote with Larry Rothstein, a photographic Exhibition was set in collaboration with the United Nations.

Filmography

Publications
 Raising The Bar: New Horizons In Disability Sports
 Defying the Nazis: The Sharps' War
 The Gift: Stories of Triumph in the Face of Life’s Greatest Adversities

References

External links
 
 Artemis Joukowsky III

Living people
American documentary film directors
American disability rights activists
Year of birth missing (living people)